Kaguya, or Princess Kaguya may refer to:

Fiction

Kaguya-hime
  ("Princess Kaguya"), the main character in The Tale of the Bamboo Cutter, thought to be the oldest Japanese folktale
 The Tale of the Princess Kaguya (film), a 2013 Studio Ghibli animated film based on the folktale
 Kaguyahime (manga), a manga series by Reiko Shimizu based on the folktale
 Prince Kaguya, a musical based on the folktale

Other fictional elements
 Kaguya, in the anime film InuYasha the Movie: The Castle Beyond the Looking Glass
 Kaguya, in the manga series Kaze ga Gotoku
 Kaguya, in the manga series Planet Ladder
 Kaguya, in the manga series Yaiba
 Kaguya, in the video game Ōkami
 Kaguya Houraisan, in the video game series Touhou Project
 Kaguya Nanbu, in the video game series Super Robot Taisen OG Saga: Endless Frontier
 Kaguya Ōtsutsuki, in the anime and manga series Naruto
 Kaguya Shinomiya, in the manga series Kaguya-sama: Love Is War
 Kaguya Sumeragi, in the anime series Code Geass
 Kimimaro Kaguya, in the anime and manga series Naruto
Planet Kaguya, appearing in the anime film Doraemon: Nobita's Chronicle of the Moon Exploration
 Princess Snow Kaguya, in the anime film Sailor Moon S: The Movie

Other uses
 Kaguya (mouse), an artificially bred mouse
 Kaguya (wrestler), Japanese professional wrestler
 "Kaguya" (song), a single by Japanese boy band News
 Kaguya, the nickname for the Japanese lunar orbit spacecraft SELENE, launched in 2007
 10880 Kaguya, a minor planet named after the spacecraft